Dave Schmidt was a Washington state politician. He was first elected to the House of Representatives in 1994 and served there until his election to the Senate in 2002. He lost the 2006 Senate election to Steve Hobbs. He was the Republican nominee for his old Senate seat in 2010 but lost again to Steve Hobbs in the general election.

In 2012, he paid a $10,000 fine to settle allegations that he misspent funds from his unsuccessful 2006 reelection campaign.

On March 20, 2020 he was charged with fraud by the SEC for an alleged ICO scam.

References

Living people
Republican Party members of the Washington House of Representatives
Republican Party Washington (state) state senators
Year of birth missing (living people)